Al Ahed Football Club is a football club based in Ouzai, a district in Beirut, Lebanon, that competes in the Lebanese Premier League, the top flight of Lebanese football. The club was founded in 1964 as Al Ahed Al Jadeed, starting in the Third Division, before they first reached the Lebanese Premier League for the first time in 1996.

Nicknamed "the Yellow Castle", Ahed have won one AFC Cup title, eight Premier League titles, six FA Cup titles, eight Super Cup titles, six Elite Cup titles, and one Federation Cup title. They earned their first league title in 2008, and have won three unbeaten (in 2010, 2018 and 2022). In 2011, Ahed became the first team in Lebanon to accomplish both a domestic treble and quadruple after they won the league, the cup, the Super Cup, and the Elite Cup in the same season. In 2019, Ahed became the first Lebanese side to win the AFC Cup, defeating North Korean side April 25 in the final.

The club primarily receives support from the Shia community in Lebanon; they are also affiliated with Hezbollah, a Lebanese Shia political party and militant group. Ahed are rivals with fellow Beirut clubs Nejmeh and Ansar. Their ultras group, formed in 2018, is called "Ultras Yellow Inferno".

History

Early history (1964–1989) 
Ahed were founded in 1964 as Al Ahed Al Jadeed in Dahieh, a southern suburb of Beirut. Under the presidency of Muhieddine Anouti, the club played in the Lebanese Third Division. During the 1970s, Ahed played in Msaytbeh, an area of Beirut, under the name Al Huda Islamic Club. However, the club stopped playing as a consequence of the Israeli invasion of Lebanon in 1982.

In 1984, Anouti bought a license under the name Nejmet Al Ahed Al Jadeed but did not actually form a club. On 2 May 1985, the Lebanese Football Association granted membership to the club to continue playing football, with Mohammad Assi as president. During the 1988–89 season in the Second Division, the team qualified for a playoff match against Al-Majdi. However, the match ended 1–1 to prevent Ahed from being promoted to the Lebanese Premier League.

Lebanese Premier League (1992–2005) 
In 1992, Abdo Saad became the new president and changed the name of the club to Al Ahed because its leaders wanted a name with a Quranic meaning. In 1996, Amin Sherri became president after Saad resigned even though Ahed had reached the Second Division promotion play-offs. On 20 December 1996, Ahed were promoted to the Lebanese Premier League for the first time in their history. They won their first Premier League game on 18 October 1997, in a 1–0 win against Riada Wal Adab at the Bourj Hammoud Stadium; Moussa Bedyan scored in the 20th minute.

After two seasons in the Premier League, they were relegated to the Second Division, before they earned promotion back to the Premier League. Following the club's second promotion to the Premier League, Sherri resigned as club president and was replaced by Osama Al-Halabawi. Under Al-Halabawi, Ahed reached the finals of the 2001–02 FA Cup, the finals of the 2002 Elite Cup, and third place in the league during the 2002–03 season. Between 2004 and 2005, Ahed won two Lebanese FA Cups, one Federation Cup, and one Super Cup.

Domestic and continental success (2007–present) 

The club won their first league title in 2007–08. They went on a 44-match unbeaten streak in the Premier League from 26 October 2008 to 6 November 2010, winning the 2009–10 league without defeats as a consequence. In the 2010–11 season, Ahed won the league, the cup, the Super Cup and the Elite Cup, becoming the first team in Lebanon to accomplish both a domestic treble and a quadruple. On 25 June 2014, Tamim Sleiman was appointed president of the club by unanimous decision. In his first year as president, Ahed won the 2014–15 Premier League, the club's fourth in total. In 2017–18, Ahed won the league unbeaten, and became the first Lebanese team to do so twice. After having won the 2018–19 Premier League, their seventh in total, Ahed became the three-time defending champions, a position held once before by Ansar in 1992.

Ahed reached the AFC Cup final for the first time in 2019, becoming only the third Lebanese team do so after Nejmeh in 2005 and Safa in 2008. On 4 November 2019, Ahed beat North Korean side 25 April 1–0 in the final from a header by Issah Yakubu, becoming the first Lebanese team to win the competition. Ahed conceded only three goals in 11 matches; they had nine clean sheets, including five in a row in all five knockout matches, as they went unbeaten throughout the tournament. In 2021–22, Ahed won their third league title unbeaten, their eighth in total.

Crest and colours 
Ahed's main colour is yellow; indeed, they are nicknamed "The Yellow Castle". On 20 May 2022, Ahed announced the change to their badge to a more minimalistic logo, to celebrate their 2021–22 league title. More specifically, it became a pictogram of the three Arabic letters composing the word "Ahed" .

Stadium
Ahed owns the Al Ahed Stadium in Beirut. Located near Rafic Hariri Airport, the venue can hold 2,000 people. The club only uses its stadium for training. For games at home in club matches, Ahed uses various other stadiums in Lebanon such as the Camille Chamoun Sports City Stadium and the Saida Municipal Stadium, as they have a larger capacity.

In 2018 Benjamin Netanyahu, the Prime Minister of Israel, accused Hezbollah, a Shia political party and militant group based in Lebanon, in a speech of using the Al Ahed Stadium as a missile cluster. Gebran Bassil, the Lebanese Minister of Foreign Affairs, denied the claims.

Supporters

Ahed's fan base primarily consists of Lebanon's Shia community. The team has strong ties with Hezbollah, with whom they share the same colour, yellow. Following the introduction of ultras groups in Lebanon in 2018, Ahed formed "Ultras Yellow Inferno".

On 28 January 2009, Ahed and Iranian club Sepahan signed an informal partnership deal. The partnership was made official on 8 March 2021, involving training camps and friendly games between the two sides.

Club rivalries 

Ahed and Ansar are rivals; also located in Beirut, Ansar identify with the Hariri family and represent the most nationalist stream. In recent years, Nejmeh, another Beirut-based team, has become a fierce rival of Ahed as well. Nejmeh is the most-supported team in Lebanon, and tensions between Nejmeh and Ahed have forced the Lebanese Football Association to change venues multiple times.

Players

Current squad

Notable players

Honours

Domestic 
 Lebanese Premier League
 Winners (8): 2007–08, 2009–10, 2010–11, 2014–15, 2016–17, 2017–18, 2018–19, 2021–22
 Lebanese FA Cup
Winners (6): 2003–04, 2004–05, 2008–09, 2010–11, 2017–18, 2018–19
Runners-up (3): 2001–02, 2006–07, 2015–16
 Lebanese Elite Cup
Winners (6): 2008, 2010, 2011, 2013, 2015, 2022
Runners-up (7): 2002, 2003, 2004, 2009, 2012, 2017, 2021
 Lebanese Federation Cup
 Winners (1): 2004
 Lebanese Super Cup
Winners (8; record): 2005, 2008, 2010, 2011, 2015, 2017, 2018, 2019
Runners-up (2): 2004, 2009

Continental 
 AFC Cup
 Winners (1; Lebanese record): 2019

Performance in AFC competitions

Ahed first participated in an Asian competition in the 2005 AFC Cup, where they were drawn in the group stage with Indian club Dempo and Jordanian club Al-Hussein. After finishing second in the group, Ahed faced Sun Hei in the quarter-finals, to whom they lost 3–2 on aggregate.

Before they won the competition, their best performance was in 2016, when they reached the semi-finals before Iraqi club Al-Quwa Al-Jawiya eliminated them 4–3 on aggregate. In 2019, Ahed defeated April 25 to win the AFC Cup, becoming the first Lebanese side to do so. Previous finalists Nejmeh and Safa were defeated in the 2005 and the 2008 finals, respectively.

AFC Cup: 11 appearances
2005: Quarter-finals
2006: Group stage
2009: Group stage
2010: Group stage
2011: Round of 16
2012: Group stage
2016: Semi-finals
2018: Zonal semi-finals
2019: Champions
2020: Cancelled
2021: Zonal semi-finals

See also 
 List of football clubs in Lebanon

Notes

References

External links

Al Ahed FC at the AFC
Al Ahed FC at FA Lebanon
Al Ahed FC at LebanonFG

 
Football clubs in Lebanon
1966 establishments in Lebanon
Association football clubs established in 1966
Association football clubs established in 1985
AFC Cup winning clubs
Shia Islam in Lebanon